The first cabinet of Recep Tayyip Erdogan took office on 14 March 2003. He succeeded to the government Gul, who was in office since 18 November 2002.

After the victory of the Justice and Development (AK Party) at the parliamentary elections of July 22, 2007 and the presidential election of Abdullah Gül, who took office on 28 August, on the same day Prime Minister Recep Tayyip Erdogan created a new parliament. Many of the former cabinet members were not carried over.

 Nonpartisan minister appointed in accordance with the Article 114 of the constitution in the wake of 2007 elections

See also 
Cabinet of Turkey

Cabinet I
Erdogan I
Justice and Development Party (Turkey)
2003 establishments in Turkey
2007 disestablishments in Turkey
Cabinets established in 2003
Cabinets disestablished in 2007